Sex Court is a US adult-themed cable TV show that was produced by 'Playboy Magazine Productions that made its debut on Playboy TV in 1998. It starred Julie Strain, Alexandra Silk, an unknown man who played the Sex Court 'Bodyguard', Henry, and of course the people who wanted cases 'tried'. Usually, people would submit complaints like 'My wife's had an affair'. The cases would be 'tried' in front of 'Judge' Julie Strain, and sentences ranged from a man pouring hot, melted candlewax on his unfaithful voluptuous wife's breasts, a sexually-repressed woman having sex with a male audience member and another female 'defendant' being 'ravaged' by the Sex Court 'bodyguard' Henry.

Sex Court: The Movie is a softcore erotica movie from 2001 based on Sex Court.

Playboy filed a lawsuit against a website that was using the same name. The website's owner filed a countersuit claiming that he was using the name first and that he should get a percentage of the $8.9 million dollars the show had made. Playboy and the site later settled their differences with Playboy paying out an undisclosed amount in exchange for the website ceasing the use of the name "Sex Court".

References

External links
 

1998 American television series debuts
2001 American television series endings
Television series by Playboy Enterprises
Court shows
Playboy TV original programming